Athletics  at the 2022 European Youth Summer Olympic Festival was held at the SNP Stadium in Banská Bystrica, Slovakia, from 25 to 30 July 2022.

Medal table

Medalists

Boys

Track

Field

Combined

Girls

Track

Field

Combined

Participating nations
A total of 507 athletes from 43 nations competed in athletics at the 2022 European Youth Summer Olympic Festival:

 (1)
 (2)
 (2)
 (12)
 (6)
 (5)
 (2)
 (6)
 (10)
 (10)
 (27)
 EOC Refugee Team (1)
 (16)
 (12)
 (28)
 (4)
 (17)
 (16)
 (26)
 (4)
 (16)
 (10)
 (28)
 (3)
 (12)
 (12)
 (3)
 (2)
 (4)
 (2)
 (1)
 (1)
 (28)
 (16)
 (27)
 (2)
 (12)
 (28)
 (13)
 (24)
 (9)
 (5)
 (28)
 (14)

References

European Youth Summer Olympic Festival
2022 European Youth Summer Olympic Festival
International athletics competitions hosted by Slovakia
2022